Aftab Shaban Mirani is a Pakistani politician who has been a member of the National Assembly of Pakistan since August 2018. Previously, he was a member of the National Assembly from May 2014 to May 2018. He served as 18th Chief Minister of Sindh in 1990s.

Political career 
Mirani served as Chief Minister of Sindh in 1990.

He served as Defence Minister of Pakistan in Benazir Bhutto's government from October 1993 to November 1996.

Mirani was elected to the National Assembly of Pakistan from the Constituency NA-202 (Shikarpur-I) in 2008 Pakistani general election.

Mirani was re-elected to the National Assembly from the Constituency NA-202 (Shikarpur-I)] in 2013 Pakistani general election.

He was re-elected to the National Assembly as a candidate of Pakistan Peoples Party (PPP) from Constituency NA-202 (Qambar Shahdadkot-I) in 2018 Pakistani general election.

References

|-

Chief Ministers of Sindh
Defence Ministers of Pakistan
Baloch politicians
Pakistan People's Party politicians
Sindhi people
Living people
Pakistani MNAs 2013–2018
Pakistani MNAs 2008–2013
Pakistani MNAs 1993–1996
Pakistani MNAs 2018–2023
Year of birth missing (living people)